David Codey (born 7 July 1957) is an Australian former state and national representative rugby union player who made 13 Test match appearances for Wallabies between 1983 and 1987. He captained the national side on a single occasion in 1987.

Hailing from Orange in country New South Wales, Codey's secondary education included 4 years at the Shore school. His representative rise came after being spotted playing for Orange City and he made his state and national debut in 1983.

His sole Australian captaincy appearance was against the All Blacks in 1987. In the 1987 Rugby World Cup during the play-off for third place against Wales, he became the first Australian to be sent off during a test match.

References

Footnotes

Bibliography

External links
 

Australian rugby union captains
1957 births
Living people
Australian rugby union players
Australia international rugby union players
People educated at Sydney Church of England Grammar School
Rugby union players from New South Wales
Rugby union flankers